Xylopia amplexicaulis is a species of plant in the Annonaceae family. It is endemic to Mauritius.  It is threatened by habitat loss.

References

amplexicaulis
Endemic flora of Mauritius
Critically endangered flora of Africa
Taxonomy articles created by Polbot
Taxa named by Henri Ernest Baillon
Taxa named by Jean-Baptiste Lamarck